Run Silent, Run Deep is a 1955 novel  by Edward L. Beach, Jr.

Run Silent, Run Deep may also refer to:

Film and television
 Run Silent, Run Deep (film) a 1958 black-and-white film based loosely on the book
 "Run Silent, Run Deep" (CSI: NY episode)
 "Run Silent, Run Deep", an episode of Martian Successor Nadesico

Music
 Run Silent, Run Deep (album), an album by Terminal Power Company
 "Run Silent" or "Run Silent, Run Deep", a song by Shakespear's Sister from Sacred Heart
 "Run Silent, Run Deep", a song by Iron Maiden from No Prayer for the Dying
 "Run Silent, Run Deep", a song by Peter Wolf from Come as You Are
 "Run Silent, Run Deep", a song by Raven from All for One

See also
 Silent Running (disambiguation)